Tuomarinkartano (Finnish), Domargård (Swedish) is a northwestern neighborhood of Helsinki, Finland.

Neighbourhoods of Helsinki